The 2016 Big West Conference women's soccer tournament is the postseason women's soccer tournament for the Big West Conference to be held from November 3 to 6, 2016. The three match tournament will be held at George Allen Field in Long Beach, California. The four team single-elimination tournament will consist of two rounds based on seeding from regular season conference play. The Cal State Fullerton Titans are the three-time defending tournament champions after defeating the Long Beach State 49ers 1–0 in the championship match in 2015.

Bracket

Schedule

Semifinals

Final

See also 
 Big West Conference
 2016 Big West Conference women's soccer season
 2016 NCAA Division I women's soccer season
 2016 NCAA Division I Women's Soccer Tournament

References 
2016 Big West Women's Soccer Tournament

Big West Conference Women's Soccer Tournament
2016 Big West Conference women's soccer season